Anise Koltz (12 June 1928 – 1 March 2023) was a Luxembourgish contemporary author. Best known for her poetry and her translations of poems, she also wrote a number of children's stories. In 1962, she was a cofounder with Nic Weber of the successful literary conference series Journées littéraires de Mondorf (now Académie Européenne de Poésie) in which she has always played a key role.

Biography
Born on 12 June 1928 in the Eich district of Luxembourg City, Koltz began to write fairy stories in the 1950s mainly in German and Luxembourgish. She also worked as a translator. Many of her works have been translated into English, Spanish and Italian. She was considered to be Luxembourg's most important contemporary poet.

From 1963, the Journées littéraires de Mondorf (Mondorf Literary Days) created links between Luxembourg writers and the international scene. In 1995, the Mondorf Literary Days were revived, representing all literary genres so as to provide a wide range of authors with a platform for their works.

Koltz died on 1 March 2023, at the age of 94.

Awards
1992 – Prix Jean Malrieu
1992 – Prix Blaise Cendrars
1994 – Antonio Viccaro prize for "Chants de refus"
1996 – Batty Weber Prize
1997 – Rheinlandtaler prize from "Landschaftsverband Rheinland"
1998 – Prix Guillaume Apollinaire for Le mur du son
2005 – Jan Smrek Prize in Slovakia – for her lifelong work
2008 – Servais Prize for L'ailleurs des mots
2009 – Prix de littérature francophone Jean Arp for "La lune noircie"

Works

In Luxembourgish

In German 
Märchen, Luxembourg, 1957
Heimatlos, Gedichte, Luxembourg, 1959
Der Wolkenschimmel und andere Erzählungen, Luxembourg, 1960
Spuren nach innen, 21 Gedichte, Luxembourg, 1960
Steine und Vögel, Gedichte, München/Esslingen, 1964
Den Tag vergraben, Bechtle Verlag, 1969
Fragmente aus Babylon, Delp Verlag, 1973

Bilingual German and French 
Le cirque du soleil, Pierre Seghers, 1966
Vienne quelqu'un, Rencontre, 1970
Fragments de Babylone, Fagne, 1974
Sich der Stille hingeben, Heiderhoff Verlag, 1983

In French 
Le jour inventé, Paris, 1975
La terre monte, Belfond, Paris, 1980
Souffles sculptés, Guy Binsfeld, 1988
Chants de refus I and II, phi, 1993 and 1995
Le mur du son, phi, 1997, Prix Guillaume Apollinaire
Le paradis brûle, La Différence, 1998
La terre se tait, phi, 1999
Le cri de l'épervier, phi, 2000
Le porteur d'ombre, phi, 2001
L'avaleur de feu, phi, 2003
Béni soit le serpent, phi, 2004
L'ailleurs des mots, Éditions Arfuyen, 2007, Prix Jean Servais
La Lune noircie, Éditions Arfuyen, 2009 in connection with Prix de littérature francophone Jean Arp
La Muraille de l'Alphabet, phi, 2010]
Je renaîtrai, Éditions Arfuyen, 2011

Bilingual French and English 

At the Devil's Banquets, Dedalus Press, 1998. 
At the Edge of Night, Arc Publications, 2009.

References

Bibliography
Forderer, Manfred: "Anfang und Ende der abendländischen Lyrik: Untersuchungen zum homerischen Apollonhymnus und zu Anise Koltz", Amsterdam. 1971.
Brucher, Roger: "Anise Koltz, de traces et d'aigle", Virton: La Dryade. 1976.
Weins, Alain: "Kann Poesie die Welt verändern?" – Die Geschichte der Mondorfer Dichtertage, Echternach/Mersch: Phi. 1999.
Caldognetto, Maria Luisa: "Anise Koltz: 'Il paradiso brucia'", in: Poesia. Milano: Crocetti. n° 153. (September 2001). pp. 32–43.

External links
'La poétesse luxembourgeoise Anise Koltz... entretient toujours – des relations fructueuses avec de nombreux poètes, écrivains et artistes...' Littérature: Anise Koltz honorée – Le Quotidien, 06/03/2009
 

1928 births
2023 deaths
Luxembourgian poets
Luxembourgian translators
Luxembourgian writers
People from Luxembourg City
Prix Guillaume Apollinaire winners
Prix Goncourt de la Poésie winners